Watch Me is the third studio album by American country music singer Lorrie Morgan. The album was her first for BNA Records. It was released on 9 October 1992. It peaked at #15 on the Billboard country albums chart, and includes the singles "Watch Me" (#2) "What Part of No" (#1), "I Guess You Had to Be There" (#14), and "Half Enough" (#8). Also included on this album is a cover of "It's a Heartache", a pop standard previously recorded by Bonnie Tyler and Juice Newton.

Jimmy Griffin, Richard Mainegra, and Rick Yancey are all featured as background vocalists on this album. At the time, these three musicians recorded on BNA as The Remingtons. Mainegra and Yancey also wrote the last track, "She's Takin' Him Back Again", which was omitted from the cassette version of Watch Me.

Track listing

Production
Richard Landis - producer
Chuck Ainlay - engineer, mixing
Jeff Giedt - assistant engineer
Russ Martin - mixing assistant
Denny Purcell - mastering
Grahame Smith - assistant engineer
Ed Thacker - engineer

Personnel
As listed in liner notes.
Michael Black – background vocals
Mark E. Blumberg – keyboards
Jessica Bouchér – background vocals
Larry Byrom – acoustic guitar
Dale Daniel – background vocals
Glen Duncan – fiddle, mandolin
Sonny Garrish – steel guitar
Steve Gibson – acoustic guitar, electric guitar
Jimmy Griffin – background vocals
Mitch Humphries – keyboards
John Barlow Jarvis – keyboards
Angela Kaset – background vocals
Jerome Kimbrough – acoustic guitar
Paul Leim – drums, percussion
Richard Mainegra – background vocals
Carl Marsh – keyboards
Tom Roady – percussion
Lisa Silver – background vocals
Dennis Wilson – background vocals
Glenn Worf – bass guitar
Rick Yancey – background vocals
Curtis "Mr. Harmony" Young – background vocals

Charts

Weekly charts

Year-end charts

References

1992 albums
BNA Records albums
Lorrie Morgan albums
Albums produced by Richard Landis